Sergio Armando Mitre (born February 16, 1981) is a Mexican-American former professional baseball pitcher. He played in Major League Baseball (MLB) for the Chicago Cubs, Florida Marlins, Milwaukee Brewers, and New York Yankees. In 2022, he was sentenced to 50 years in prison by Mexican authorities for the murder of his then-girlfriend's 22-month-old daughter.

Background
Mitre is of Mexican American descent. He grew up in Tijuana, Mexico, where he trained in the arts of kenpo, boxing, and wrestling due to frequent street fights.

Mitre graduated from Montgomery High School in San Diego, California, in June 1999.  He has a son named Sam (Sergio Armando Mitre III), who was born on December 29, 2006.

Pro career

Chicago Cubs
Mitre was the Chicago Cubs' 7th-round selection in the 2001 Major League Baseball Draft out of San Diego City College.  He was the second player out of the 2001 draft to make it to the majors with the Cubs, the first being Mark Prior. Mitre made his major league debut for the Cubs in  after being called up from the West Tenn Diamond Jaxx (at the time, West Tenn was the Cubs' Double-A affiliate). He played in 3 games in 2003 (2 starts) and had an 0–1 record with an 8.31 ERA.

In , Mitre started out the season on the Opening Day roster, filling in for the injured Mark Prior. He was sent down to the Triple-A Iowa Cubs after Prior came back from injury. On August 13, 2004, Mitre pitched a complete game shutout against the Albuquerque Isotopes. Mitre gave up only a double and a walk, both coming in the first inning of the game. After this, Mitre sat down 23 straight batters, striking out 9 batters in the game. He became the Pacific Coast League's Player of the Week.  He finished the Iowa Cubs 2004 season (after going back and forth to Chicago) with a 6–4 record, and a 2.97 ERA.

Mitre returned to the majors after the September roster expansions and pitched 4 games out of the bullpen. His season ending total was a 2–4 record with a 6.62 ERA in 12 games (9 starts).

In , Mitre started off on Triple-A Iowa's roster, and on May 10, he was recalled from Iowa, only to be sent down after two games and not pitching in either. On May 24, 2005, he was called up for a spot start. On June 14, 2005, Mitre pitched his first complete game, along with his first shutout in a 14–0 victory over the Florida Marlins against Josh Beckett.

Florida Marlins
On December 7, 2005, Mitre and minor league pitchers Ricky Nolasco and Renyel Pinto were traded to the Florida Marlins for Juan Pierre.

In the  season, Mitre won a career-high five games. He also set career bests with 27 games played, 27 starts, 149.0 innings pitched and 80 strikeouts. Mitre had a streak of not allowing an earned run in 24.2 consecutive innings.  This streak lasted five starts, beginning May 20 at Tampa and ending June 15 at Kansas City. He made Marlins history with his 1.12 ERA in May, the second lowest for a starting pitcher during May in Marlins history, a feat only topped by Chris Hammond, who turned in a 0.61 ERA in May . Mitre began to see injury problems beginning in 2007, missing two weeks with a blister on his right middle finger, and time later in the season for a strained right hamstring. He had three stints on the disabled list, foreshadowing his  season.

Mitre did not play in a game in 2008. On July 15, Mitre underwent Tommy John ligament replacement surgery to fix right forearm tightness. As is the case with all Tommy John surgery patients, he was expected to miss 12–18 months. He was released by the Marlins at the end of the 2008 season.

New York Yankees
On November 3, Mitre signed a one-year minor league contract with the New York Yankees with an option for 2010.

Mitre was suspended for the first 50 games of the 2009 season after testing positive for androstenedione in August 2008. Mitre said the androstenedione came from a contaminated legal supplement purchased from GNC, but took full responsibility for his actions. He served his suspension while still on the disabled list from last year's Tommy John surgery.

Mitre returned to action, pitching well in nine starts for the Single-A Tampa Yankees and Triple-A Scranton/Wilkes-Barre Yankees.  Replacing an injured Chien-Ming Wang, Mitre was called up to the majors to start against the Baltimore Orioles on July 21, 2009. Mitre pitched 5 innings, allowed three runs, and got the win. Mitre earned a World Series ring when the Yankees won their 27th World Series title, though he was not on the postseason roster.

Mitre recorded his first career save on August 19, 2010, pitching the last 3 innings of a Yankees 11–5 win over the Detroit Tigers.

Milwaukee Brewers
On March 25, 2011, Mitre was traded to the Milwaukee Brewers for Chris Dickerson. He was designated for assignment on June 27, after posting a 3.27 ERA in 33 innings.

Return to the Yankees
Mitre was traded back to the Yankees on June 29, 2011 for cash considerations.  On July 19, he was placed on the 15-day disabled list with inflammation in his right shoulder. In four games with the Yankees, he posted an 11.81 ERA and was not offered a contract for the 2012 season.

Later career
After his MLB career, Mitre played baseball in Japan while continuing to rehab his shoulder. He was unable to make a comeback, and retired as an active player.

Eventually, Mitre returned to California. He was a coach for a competitive baseball organization that he founded called the Playmakers.

On April 29, 2017, Mitre came out of retirement and signed with the Bravos de León of the Mexican Baseball League. He was traded to the Toros de Tijuana on July 9, 2017. He was released from the organization on July 26, 2018.

On January 26, 2019, Mitre signed with the Tecolotes de los Dos Laredos of the Mexican League. He was released on May 9. On May 14, Mitre signed with the Saraperos de Saltillo of the Mexican League.

Legal troubles

2019 domestic violence arrest
On September 1, 2019, while playing for the Saraperos de Saltillo of the Mexican League, Mitre was arrested on suspicion of assaulting a woman, after employees at a Quality Inn in Saltillo alerted authorities of a domestic violence situation taking place inside a suite. Following his arrest, the Saraperos owner denounced Mitre's actions, and he was later suspended indefinitely by the team. Mitre avoided jail time by paying a fine of 20,000 pesos.

2020 murder
On July 13, 2020, Mitre was arrested in Saltillo for possession of marijuana. On July 14, Mitre was charged with femicide and aggravated statutory rape over the death and possible sexual assault of his girlfriend's daughter; he was booked into the Saltillo Prison. After the charges were announced, Mitre was released by the Saraperos and suspended indefinitely by the Mexican League. The statutory rape charges were later dropped after evidence showed the girl was not sexually assaulted.

On January 20, 2022, Mitre was sentenced to 50 years in prison after being convicted in Mexico for femicide in the murder of his then-girlfriend's 22-month-old daughter. He was also ordered to issue a public apology, and pay a MX$379,500 penalty for damages caused by his actions. Following the sentencing, Mitre's lawyers announced he would be appealing the conviction.

References

External links

1981 births
Living people
Águilas de Mexicali players
American baseball players of Mexican descent
American expatriate baseball players in Japan
American expatriate baseball players in Mexico
American sportspeople in doping cases
Baseball players suspended for drug offenses
Baseball players from Los Angeles
Baseball players from San Diego
Bravos de León players
Chicago Cubs players
Florida Marlins players
Gulf Coast Marlins players
Iowa Cubs players
Jupiter Hammerheads players
Lansing Lugnuts players
Major League Baseball pitchers
Mexican League baseball pitchers
Milwaukee Brewers players
New York Yankees players
San Diego City Knights baseball players
Saraperos de Saltillo players
Scranton/Wilkes-Barre Yankees players
Tampa Yankees players
Tecolotes de los Dos Laredos players
Tohoku Rakuten Golden Eagles players
Toros de Tijuana players
Tomateros de Culiacán players
West Tennessee Diamond Jaxx players
American people convicted of murder
American murderers of children
People convicted of murder by Mexico
Sportspeople convicted of murder